Evippe may refer to:

Euippe or Evippe, any one of six women in Greek mythology
Evippe (genus), a genus of moth in the family Gelechiidae